Gabriel Dessauer (born 4 December 1955) is a German cantor, concert organist, and academic. He was responsible for the church music at St. Bonifatius, Wiesbaden from 1981 to 2021, conducting the Chor von St. Bonifatius until 2018. He is an internationally-known organ recitalist, and was an organ teacher on the faculty of the Hochschule für Musik Mainz. In 1985, he founded the German-English project choir, Reger-Chor. He has lectured at international conferences, especially about the music of Max Reger, who was a member of the St. Bonifatius parish.

Career 

Dessauer was born in Würzburg, the son of Guido Dessauer and his wife Gabrielle. He received his Abitur at the Kolleg St. Blasien in 1974. He then studied church music at the Richard-Strauss-Konservatorium in Munich for a year, studying organ with Elmar Schloter. He continued his studies with Franz Lehrndorfer and received the Meisterklassendiplom (master class diploma) in 1982. He was a member of Karl Richter's Münchener Bach-Chor.

Dessauer was the organist for services at the Kolleg St. Blasien 1971–1974, then at the Akademie Tutzing for one year and conductor of the choir of the Protestant parish in Tutzing. From 1975 to 1981 he was cantor of St. Andreas Church, Munich.

Church music at St. Bonifatius, Wiesbaden 

Dessauer has been the cantor at St. Bonifatius, Wiesbaden, the central Catholic church in the capital of Hesse, since 1981. He is the conductor of the 107-member Chor von St. Bonifatius, founded in 1862, of the children's choir Kinderchor von St. Bonifatius, and of the Schola for Gregorian chant. The church choir sings at services, including regular orchestral masses by Haydn, Mozart, Beethoven, and Schubert for Christmas and Easter, accompanied by members of the orchestra of the Hessisches Staatstheater Wiesbaden, with soloists from the Hochschule für Musik Mainz such as Andreas Karasiak and students. In 2011 they performed the Mass No. 1 in B major by Johann Nepomuk Hummel, and Hans Leo Hassler's Missa super Dixit Maria in 2012. On Dessauer's initiative, the organ built in 1954 was refurbished by Hugo Mayer Orgelbau in 1985.

Every year, typically on 3 October, German Unity Day, Dessauer has conducted choral concerts of works such as Mendelssohn's Elias, Ein deutsches Requiem of Brahms, and Verdi's Messa da Requiem. Both Chor and Kinderchor appeared in performances of Hermann Suter's Le Laudi (1998 and 2007), and in the German premiere of John Rutter's Mass of the Children in 2004. In 2006, Dessauer conducted Karl Jenkins's Requiem, composed in 2004. In 2010, he chose works by Bach, including his Mass in G minor and choral movements from cantatas BWV 140, BWV 12, BWV 120 and Wir danken dir, Gott, wir danken dir, BWV 29. In 2011 he conducted Haydn's Die Schöpfung. The children's choir sang along with the soprano.

To celebrate the 150th anniversary of the choir in 2012, Dessauer commissioned Colin Mawby to compose the Missa solemnis Bonifatius-Messe. Mawby wrote the Mass in 2011 for the forces available at the church (soprano, choir, children's choir, oboe and organ), and the work was premiered on 3 October 2012. The organist was Ignace Michiels from St. Salvator's Cathedral in Bruges, soprano Natascha Jung, and oboist Leonie Dessauer. A second performance took place on 3 November in the Frankfurter Dom, with organist Andreas Boltz. In 2013 he performed Schubert's Mass No. 6 along with his Unfinished Symphony. The concert of 2014 was John Rutter's Magnificat.

Dessauer first continued the tradition of the Stunde der Kirchenmusik ("hour of church music") monthly concert, and then began a series Boni-Musikwochen instead, grouping choral and organ concerts around a theme within the span of one to two weeks. The Musikwochen 2010, Reger und mehr ("Reger and more"), presented concerts given by  Kent Tritle and Ignace Michiels, among others.

Dessauer appeared with the Chor von St. Bonifatius in Azkoitia and San Sebastián on a Cavaillé-Coll-organ (1986) at both churches, at the Limburg Cathedral (1987), in St. Jakobus, Görlitz (1990), and in Memphis, Tennessee (1996). They appeared in Rome in 2008, when they performed Vivaldi's Gloria and Haydn's Nelson Mass in San Paolo dentro le Mura in concert, and sang during mass at St. Peter's Basilica.

Organ recitals 

Dessauer has appeared in recitals in Europe and the U.S., at the Washington National Cathedral and St. Patrick's Cathedral, New York. He played the Kotzschmar organ at the Merrill Auditorium in Portland, Maine, and in the Cathedral of Our Lady of the Angels in Los Angeles. In 2004, he lectured at the National Convention of the American Guild of Organists in Los Angeles on the choral music of Max Reger, who was a member of the parish of St. Bonifatius while he studied and lived in Wiesbaden. In 2005, Dessauer played at the Spreckels Organ Pavilion in San Diego. In 2010, he gave a recital at St. Ignatius Loyola, New York.

Since 1992, Dessauer has conducted events for the Rheingau Musik Festival called the Orgeltour (organ tour), visiting historic organs in the region. The first tours covered historic organs of the Rheingau; later ones extended to the cathedrals of Worms and Speyer, Würzburg, and Fulda.

Until 2010, Dessauer played a regular concert on New Year's Eve on the Walcker organ at the Marktkirche, Wiesbaden, together with church organist Hans Uwe Hielscher. To celebrate the bicentenary of Franz Liszt's birth in 2011, he played three major organ works by the composer on instruments that were built around the time of the compositions, Fantasy and Fugue on the Theme B-A-C-H, Variations on Bach's "Weinen, Klagen" (1863), and Fantasy and Fugue on the chorale Ad nos ad salutarem undam.

In 2014, Dessauer toured in the US, playing concerts at the Washington National Cathedral, at St. Mary's Cathedral in San Francisco, California, and at the Salt Lake Tabernacle organ in Salt Lake City.

In 2020, Dessauer organised the Winterspiele concert series to honour the 150th anniversary of Louis Vierne, playing his Third Organ Symphony, among others, in the summer instead of winter because the planned concert was cancelled due to the coronavirus pandemic.

Dessauer retired at the end of 2021, succeeded by Johannes Schröder.

Teaching 
From 1995 to 2013, Dessauer was an organ teacher at the Hochschule für Musik Mainz, part of the Gutenberg University in Mainz.

Reger-Chor 

In 1985, Dessauer invited singers to form a choir to perform a single work, the Hebbel-Requiem of Max Reger in the organ version by the Munich organist and composer Max Beckschäfer. The name Reger-Chor was chosen in 1988, when the next project was dedicated to the German premiere of Joseph Jongen's Missa op. 111. Later projects included one of the first performances in Germany of Rutter's Requiem, recorded on the Reger-Chor's first CD in 1990. In 2001 an international collaboration began with the organist Ignace Michiels, bringing together an almost equal number of singers from Flanders and the Rhein-Main Region to perform an annual concert both in Germany and Belgium. In 2003 he conducted the premiere of the organ version of Reger's Der 100. Psalm by François Callebout.

In addition to works by Reger, Dessauer chose rarely-performed church music by composers such as Herbert Howells, Benjamin Britten, Herbert Sumsion, Maurice Duruflé, Edward Elgar, Frederick Delius, William Lloyd Webber, Jules Van Nuffel, Joseph Ryelandt, Andrew Carter, Kurt Hessenberg, Rupert Lang, Morten Lauridsen, and Eric Whitacre. In 2015 he conducted Bach's Missa of 1733 in B-minor in the newly-edited parts for the Dresden court, with members of the orchestra of the Hessisches Staatstheater Wiesbaden.

Choral projects 

In 1999 Dessauer collaborated with Ignace Michiels, organist of St. Salvator's Cathedral in Bruges, in a joint project to bring a century of violence to a close. The same programme was performed in both Bruges and Wiesbaden by the Cantores and Chor von St. Bonifatius choirs, with Michiels playing the organ and Dessauer conducting. The concert in Bruges on 23 October 1999 was named Eeuw van zinloos Geweld (Century of meaningless violence) and expressed it using Maurice Duruflé's Prélude et Fugue sur le nom d'Alain, Jules Van Nuffel's , Jehan Alain's Litanies, Rudolf Mauersberger's Wie liegt die Stadt so wüst, Gerald Hendrie's Exsultate from the sonata In praise of reconciliation, and Duruflé's Requiem. The Wiesbaden concert was called Versöhnungskonzert zum Ende des Jahrhunderts (Concert of reconciliation at the end of the century).

In 1995 Dessauer prepared the choir for a memorial concert commemorating the 50th anniversary of the end of World War II. On 8 May 1995, Britten's War Requiem was performed in a ceremony of the government of Hesse at the Kurhaus Wiesbaden, with choirs from countries who were opponents during the war: the Swindon Choral Society from Swindon, UK, the Macon Civic Chorale from Macon, Georgia, and the Schiersteiner Kantorei conducted by Martin Lutz. A year later they took part in a performance of the work with similar forces in Macon.

In November 2009 Dessauer again performed Duruflé's Requiem, this time with a choir of volunteers who wanted to commemorate the Holocaust in a Gedenkkonzert gegen Antisemitismus, or a concert against Antisemitism. Janina Moeller sang the mezzo-soprano solo, and Petra Morath-Pusinelli was the organist.

In November 2015 Dessauer was the organist for a sing-along organised by the Diocese of Limburg in St. Bonifatius. A choir of 150 volunteers studied Gabriel Fauré's Requiem and performed it as part of the Wiesbadener Bachwochen festival. As a contrast, Dessauer performed Olivier Latry's Salve Regina organ meditations, in which, according to a reviewer, he made the listener feel "...the complete cosmos of humanity, including the cruelty and violence, from which this prayer asks for salvation from" ("den gesamten Kosmos des Menschlichen nachempfinden ließ, einschließlich der Grausamkeit und Gewalt, aus der in diesem Gebet um Errettung gebeten wird").

Recordings 

 Kontraste (Contrast), Gabriel Dessauer at the Mayer organ of St. Bonifatius
 Orgel-Feuerwerk I – V (Organ Fireworks)
 Just for Fun, Organ Historical Society Catalog
 John Rutter: Requiem, motets of Reger, Reubke's Sonata on the 94th Psalm, Reger-Chor, Monika Fuhrmann (soprano), instrumentalists, organist (Rutter): Petra Morath, organist (Reubke) and conductor Gabriel Dessauer (1990, recorded live in St. Bonifatius Wiesbaden)
 Romantische Orgelkonzerte, Marco Enrico Bossi: Organ concerto A minor op. 100, Josef Gabriel Rheinberger: Organ concerto G minor op. 177, Léon Boëllmann: Suite Gothique op. 25, Kammerphilharmonie Rhein-Main, conductor: Jürgen Bruns (1997)
 Hermann Suter: Le Laudi, Zofia Kilanowicz, Pamela Pantos, Andreas Karasiak, Johann Werner Prein, Chor von St. Bonifatius Wiesbaden, Kinderchor von St. Bonifatius, Witold Lutoslawski Philharmonic Wroclaw, 1999
 Max Reger: Hebbel-Requiem, organ works, Reger-Chor-International, conductor Gabriel Dessauer (2001, recorded live in St. Bonifatius Wiesbaden)
 Max Reger: Der 100. Psalm, Introduction, Passacaglia and Fugue in E minor op. 127, Reger-Chor-International, conductor Gabriel Dessauer (2003, recorded live in St. Bonifatius Wiesbaden)

References

External links 

 Kantor Gabriel Dessauer i. R. St. Bonifatius
 , from Coronation Mass, 1 April 2018, St. Bonifatius
 
 , by Naji Hakim 1 April 2018, St. Bonifatius

German choral conductors
German male conductors (music)
German classical organists
German male organists
University of Music and Performing Arts Munich alumni
Academic staff of Johannes Gutenberg University Mainz
Living people
1955 births
Musicians from Würzburg
21st-century German conductors (music)
21st-century organists
21st-century German male musicians
Male classical organists
Dessauer family